The College Board offers several awards to selected students who take Advanced Placement (AP) exams.

AP scholar designations
Each year, the AP program recognizes students who have performed exceptionally well on AP examinations. Exams are taken in May and awards are usually granted in July. The following designations can be earned:

Previously, State AP Scholar Awards were distributed to the top male and female student of each state. However, the State AP Scholar awards were discontinued as of the May 2020 administration.

*The National AP Scholar Awards were also discontinued following the May 2020 administration.

Note':' "All AP exams taken" refers to all AP exams taken in any year. It is not restricted to the year in which the award is issued.

AP International Diploma
The AP program also awards the AP International Diploma (APID) for overseas study  to students who have applied to colleges outside of the United States that have completed a sequence of AP exams with satisfactory scores. Prior to May 2006, a student had to earn a score of three or better on five or more AP exams in three of the five subject areas shown in the table below, with certain subject area requirements. As of May 2006, the College Board had implemented new requirements for awarding the AP International Diploma.

References

 
Student awards